"I Don't Wanna Stop" was released as the first single from the ATB's album Addicted to Music. It is also found on Seven Years: 1998-2005.

CD single track listings

I Don't Wanna Stop (Germany Release) 
 "I Don't Wanna Stop" (Radio Edit) 3:35
 "I Don't Wanna Stop" (Clubb Mix) 9:27
 "I Don't Wanna Stop" (Original Mix) 8:56

I Don't Wanna Stop (US Release) 
 "I Don't Wanna Stop" (Original Radio Mix) 3:35
 "I Don't Wanna Stop" (Molella Radio Edit) 3:36
 "I Don't Wanna Stop" (Original Mix) 8:57
 "I Don't Wanna Stop" (Clubb Mix) 9:28
 "I Don't Wanna Stop" (Molella Club Mix) 5:57
 "Addicted To Music DVD Trailer" (Enhanced Video)

I Don't Wanna Stop (Netherlands Release) 
 "I Don't Wanna Stop" (Original Radio Mix) 3:35
 "I Don't Wanna Stop" (Molella Radio Edit) 3:36
 "I Don't Wanna Stop" (Clubb Mix) 9:28
 "I Don't Wanna Stop" (Molella Club Mix) 5:57
 "I Don't Wanna Stop" (Original Mix) 8:57

Charts

2003 singles
ATB songs
Songs written by André Tanneberger